The W.O.W. Hall, also stylized as WOW Hall, (AKA Community Center for the Performing Arts) is a performing arts venue in Eugene, Oregon, United States.

The hall was bought in 1906 by the Woodmen of the World (W.O.W.) lodge, and later in 1932 they built the current structure, which was the most expensive building built in Eugene that year at $8,000. Originally, the hall was installed with a hard rock maple dance floor to be used for square dancing and ballroom dancing.

In 1975, the hall was up for sale and was in danger of being demolished. Eventually, patrons of the hall organized to form the committee to Secure a Westside Community Center for the Performing Arts. They got a first option to purchase the hall when it went up for sale in December of that year. In 1983 the committee was able to buy the property and burned the lease in celebration.

The W.O.W. Hall was listed on the National Register of Historic Places in 1996.

On January 14, 2022, a mass shooting outside the venue hospitalized six people. As of January 18, no arrests have been made and police seek one suspect.

References

External links
The W.O.W. Hall (official website)

Music venues in Oregon
Buildings and structures completed in 1932
Culture of Eugene, Oregon
Buildings and structures in Eugene, Oregon
Woodmen of the World buildings
National Register of Historic Places in Eugene, Oregon
Tourist attractions in Eugene, Oregon
Clubhouses on the National Register of Historic Places in Oregon
1932 establishments in Oregon